Lotoria lotoria, common name the black-spotted snail or washing bath triton, is a species of predatory sea snail, a tropical marine gastropod mollusc in the family Cymatiidae. This species was previously known as Cymatium lotorium.

Fossil records

Fossils from this family date back to the Eocene (age range: from 55.8 to 0.012 million years ago).

Description

Distribution
This species of marine snail lives in the tropical Indo-Pacific oceans.

Habitat
Lotoria lotoria is quite common in coral reefs in Australia and the Indian Ocean.

References

 Linnaeus, C. (1758). Systema Naturae per regna tria naturae, secundum classes, ordines, genera, species, cum characteribus, differentiis, synonymis, locis. Editio decima, reformata. Laurentius Salvius: Holmiae. ii, 824 pp
 Drivas, J.; Jay, M. (1987). Coquillages de La Réunion et de l'Île Maurice. Collection Les Beautés de la Nature. Delachaux et Niestlé: Neuchâtel. . 159 pp
 Liu J.Y. [Ruiyu] (ed.). (2008). Checklist of marine biota of China seas. China Science Press. 1267 pp

External links
 Conchology
 Emerson W.K. & Old W.E. (1963). A new subgenus and species of Cymatium (Mollusca, Gastropoda). American Museum Novitates. 2137: 1–13

Cymatiidae
Gastropods described in 1758
Taxa named by Carl Linnaeus